Afrique is a 1971 studio album by Count Basie and his orchestra, arranged & conducted by Oliver Nelson released by the Flying Dutchman label

Reception

AllMusic reviewer Bruce Eder stated: "In late 1970, more than 35 years into his career as a bandleader, Count Basie, working with producer Bob Thiele and arranger/conductor/saxman Oliver Nelson, went into the studio and cut this album of big band blues built on recent compositions -- and they made it sound cutting-edge and as urgent as anything the man had ever turned his talent toward. ... Afrique is one of a handful of absolutely essential post-big band-era albums by him".

Track listing 
All compositions by Oliver Nelson except where noted
 "Step Right Up" – 4:15
 "Hobo Flats" – 6:13
 "Gypsy Queen" – 4:00 (Gabor Szabo)
 "Love Flower" – 2:53 (Albert Ayler)
 "Afrique" – 3:06
 "Kilimanjaro" – 6:52
 "African Sunrise" – 5:11
 "Japan" – 5:05 (Pharoah Sanders)

Personnel
The Count Basie Orchestra
 Bill Adkins - alto sax
 Bob Ashton - alto, baritone & tenor sax, flute
 Count Basie - organ, piano
 Paul Cohen - trumpet, flugelhorn
 George Cohn - trumpet, flugelhorn
 Eddie "Lockjaw" Davis - tenor sax
 Eric Dixon - flute, tenor sax
 Steven Galloway - trombone
 Freddie Green - guitar
 Bill Hughes - trombone
 Harold Jones - drums
 Norman Keenan - bass
 Richard Landrum - percussion
 Hubert Laws - flute
 Buddy Lucas - harmonica
 Pete Minger - trumpet, flugelhorn
 Sonny Morgan - bongos
 Oliver Nelson - arranger, conductor, tenor sax
 Bobby Plater - alto sax, flute
 Cecil Payne - baritone sax, flute
 Waymon Reed - trumpet, flugelhorn
 Warren Smith, Jr. - drums, percussion, vibes
 Mel Wanzo - trombone
 John Watson - trombone
 John Williams - bass

References

1971 albums
Count Basie Orchestra albums
Albums arranged by Oliver Nelson
Flying Dutchman Records albums
Albums conducted by Oliver Nelson
Doctor Jazz Records albums